Octavia Alfred is a Dominican politician who serves as the current Minister for Education, Human Resource Planning, Vocational Training and Nation Excellence. Prior to entering parliament in 2019, she had worked as a teacher since 1985.  In 2021, as Minister, Alfred supported efforts to maintain the use of Creole in Dominica.

References

Living people
Dominica Labour Party politicians
Members of the House of Assembly of Dominica
Dominica women in politics
Year of birth missing (living people)
21st-century women politicians
Women government ministers of Dominica